Giulio Dalla Rosa or Giulio Della Rosa (10 October 1642 – 31 December 1699) was a Roman Catholic prelate who served as Bishop of Borgo San Donnino from 1698 to 1699.

Biography
Giulio Dalla Rosa was born in Parma, Italy on 10 October 1642 and ordained a priest on 6 June 1666. On 21 July 1698, he was appointed during the papacy of Pope Innocent XII as Bishop of Borgo San Donnino. On 25 July 1698, he was consecrated bishop by Emmanuel-Theódose de la Tour d'Auvergne de Bouillon, Cardinal-Bishop of Porto e Santa Rufina, with Francesco Pannocchieschi d'Elci, Archbishop of Pisa, and Prospero Bottini, Titular Archbishop of Myra, serving as co-consecrators. He served as Bishop of Borgo San Donnino until his death on 31 December 1699.

References

External links and additional sources
 (for Chronology of Bishops)
 (for Chronology of Bishops)

17th-century Italian Roman Catholic bishops
Bishops appointed by Pope Innocent XII
1642 births
1699 deaths
Religious leaders from Parma